This is a list of telephone area codes in the U.S. state of Michigan:

231 – Northwestern Lower Michigan: Traverse City, Ludington, Muskegon, Petoskey, Big Rapids and Cheboygan
248 – Northern Metro Detroit: All of Oakland County, Northville, and most of Northville Township; overlays with area code 947
269 – Southwestern Michigan: Battle Creek, Benton Harbor, Allegan, Hastings, Kalamazoo, and St Joseph 
313 – Wayne County: Detroit, Dearborn, Redford Township, and the Grosse Pointes
517 – South Central Michigan: Lansing, East Lansing, Jackson, Charlotte, Coldwater, Howell, Hillsdale, and Adrian 
586 – Northeastern Metro Detroit: All of Macomb County
616 – Western Michigan: Grand Rapids, Holland, Greenville, Grand Haven, Zeeland, and Ionia 
734 – Western and Down River/ Southeastern Michigan Metro Detroit: Ann Arbor, Monroe, Wayne, and Ypsilanti
810 – Southern Flint/Tri-Cities and The Thumb: Port Huron, Flint, Flushing, Otisville, Davison, Brighton, Sandusky, and Lapeer
906 – Upper Peninsula: Marquette, Sault Ste. Marie, St. Ignace, Escanaba, Iron Mountain, Munising, and Mackinac Island
947 – Northern Metro Detroit: All of Oakland County, Northville, and most of Northville Township; overlays with area code 248
989 – Northern, Flint/Tri-Cities and Northeastern Lower Michigan: Alpena, Mt. Pleasant, Bay City, Saginaw, Midland, Owosso, Gaylord, and Bad Axe

An additional planned area code that is not yet in service:
679 – A future overlay with Area code 313

Chronology
Michigan's numbering plan expanded from three area codes in 1947 to twelve:
1947: Area codes 313, 517 and 616 are three of the original 86 area codes in the North American Numbering Plan.
1961: Area code 906 was created in the first split of 616.
1993: Area code 810 was created in the first split of 313.
1997: Area code 734 was created in the second split of 313. and area code 248 was created in the first split of 810.
1999: Area code 231 was created in the second split of 616.
2001: Area code 586 was created in the second split of 810, and area code 989 was created in the first split of 517.
2002: Area code 269 was created in the third split of 616, while area code 947 was created as an overlay of 248.

Thus, as of October 30, 2019, the original area code 313 has been split and overlaid five times, producing six of Michigan's twelve area codes; original area code 616 has been split three times, accounting for four of the twelve area codes; and area code 517 has been split once, accounting for the last two of the twelve area codes.

References

 
Michigan
Area codes